Candy is a surname, given name, nickname or stage name. It is often used as a hypocorism for the feminine given name Candace. Notable people with the name include:

Surname:
 Brooke Candy (born 1989), American rapper
 Charles Candy (1832–1910), Union officer in the American Civil War
 Christian and Nick Candy, property developers
 Don Candy (1929–2020), Australian tennis player
 Henry Candy (born 1944), British racehorse trainer
 John Candy (1950–1994), Canadian comedic actor

Given name, nickname or stage name:
 Candy, a slave accused of witchcraft during the Salem witch trials
 Candy Atherton (1955–2017), British journalist and former Member of Parliament
 Candy Barr (1935–2005), American stripper, exotic dancer and model
 Candy Broad (born 1956), Australian politician
 Candy Candido (1913–1999), American radio performer, bass player and voice actor
 Candy Clark (born 1947), American actress
 Candy Crowley (born 1948), CNN television anchor and chief political correspondent
 Candy Cummings (1848–1924), American baseball player credited with inventing the curve ball
 Candy Darling (1944–1974), American transgender actress
 Candy Devine (born 1956), American actress
 Candy Dulfer (born 1969), Dutch jazz saxophonist
 Candy Jernigan (1952–1991), American artist and designer
Candy Johnson (1944 – 2012), was an American singer and dancer who appeared in several films in the 1960s
 Candy Jones (1925–1990), born Jessica Arline Wilcox, American fashion model, writer and radio talk show hostess
 Candy Hsu (born 1998), Taiwanese singer-songwriter
 Candy Lo (born 1974), Canto-rock singer-songwriter and actress from Hong Kong
 Candy Maldonado (born 1960), former Major League Baseball player, baseball commentator
 Candy Nelson (1849–1910), early Major League Baseball player
 Candy Reynolds (born 1955), American former tennis player
 Candy Spelling (born 1945), American author and socialite, widow of film and television producer Aaron Spelling
 Ray Candy, ring name of Ray Canty (1951–1994), American professional wrestler
 Emily Zheng (born 1993), also known as Candy, Taiwanese actress, member of Blackie

Fictional characters:
 Candy Kong, in the Donkey Kong video game series
 Candy Southern, in the Marvel Comics universe
 DJ Candy, in the MySims video game series
 Etta Candy, in the DC Comics Wonder Woman series
 Candy, in John Steinbeck's 1937 novel Of Mice and Men
 Candy Canaday, in the TV series Bonanza
 Candy, in the TV series Dave the Barbarian
 Candy, in the anime series Smile PreCure!
 Candy, the title character of Candy Candy, a 1976 Japanese shojo manga, anime and novel series
 Candy Caramella, in the TV series Space Goofs
 Candy Chiu, one of the characters of Gravity Falls
 Candy Smiles, in the TV series Cory in the House
 Candice White Andley, aka Candy, the main character of the Candy Candy franchise

See also 
 
 
 Candace (given name)
 Candice (disambiguation)
 Caddy (name)

Lists of people by nickname
English feminine given names
Nicknames